The following is a list of international prime ministerial trips made by Indira Gandhi during her tenure as the Prime Minister of India from 1966 to 1977, and again from 1980 to 1984.

First term (1966–71)

Second term (1971–77)

Third term (1980–84)

See also
 List of international prime ministerial trips made by Jawaharlal Nehru

References

Indira Gandhi administration
Gandhi